Governor Byrd may refer to:

Charles Willing Byrd (1770–1828), Acting Governor of the Northwest Territory
Harry F. Byrd (1887–1966), 50th Governor of Virginia
Richard C. Byrd (1805–1854), Acting Governor of Arkansas

See also
William Wilberforce Bird (governor) (1784–1857), Acting Governor General of India